Thomas Thacher (1850–1918) was an American lawyer and father of Thomas D. Thacher.

Thomas Thacher may also refer to:

 Thomas Anthony Thacher (1815–1886), American classicist and Yale administrator, father of Thomas Thacher
 Thomas Chandler Thacher (1858–1945), U.S. Representative from Massachusetts
 Thomas D. Thacher (1881–1950), American lawyer and judge from New York
 Thomas Thacher (minister) (1620–1678), American clergyman

See also
 Thomas Thatcher, minister from Dedham, Massachusetts